Vasili Sergeyevich Karmazinenko (born 10 August 1983) is a former Russian professional football player.

Club career
He played 14 seasons in the Russian Football National League for FC SKA-Energiya Khabarovsk, FC Sibir Novosibirsk and FC Rotor Volgograd.

References

External links
 

1983 births
People from Sakhalin Oblast
Living people
Russian footballers
Association football forwards
FC Sibir Novosibirsk players
FC SKA-Khabarovsk players
FC Rotor Volgograd players
FC Sakhalin Yuzhno-Sakhalinsk players
FC Volgar Astrakhan players
Sportspeople from Sakhalin Oblast